Cessières-Suzy is a commune in the Aisne department in northern France. The municipality was established on 1 January 2019 by merger of the former communes of Cessières and Suzy.

See also
Communes of the Aisne department

References

Communes of Aisne

Communes nouvelles of Aisne
Populated places established in 2019
2019 establishments in France